The Sabana Grande Masonic Cemetery, known formally as Cementerio Masónico de la Resp. Logia Igualdad Núm. 23 de Sabana Grande, is a historic cemetery in Sabana Grande, Puerto Rico.

The Masonic cemetery was listed on the U.S. National Register of Historic Places in 2013.

See also

 National Register of Historic Places listings in Sabana Grande, Puerto Rico

References

External links
 
 Summary sheet from the Puerto Rico State Historic Preservation Office 
 
 

Sabana Grande, Puerto Rico
1886 establishments in Puerto Rico
Cemeteries on the National Register of Historic Places in Puerto Rico
Freemasonry in the United States
Masonic buildings in Puerto Rico
Masonic cemeteries
Cemeteries established in the 1880s